The Cambridge Main Street Bridge is a concrete bowstring arch bridge located in Cambridge, Ontario. It cost approximately $55,000 and was built by W.H. Yates Construction Company Limited, with Archibald C. Crealock listed as the principal designer. Construction lasted throughout 1931 and the official opening was held on December 22, 1931.

There are two lanes for vehicular traffic and sidewalks on either side for pedestrians.

History 

The interwar period was a time of increased wealth and population growth in southern Ontario. As a result, the number of automobiles on the roads surged drastically, which created a need for updated roadways and increased means of crossing the Grand River. To meet this need, four bridges were built in the area: this bridge, the Freeport Bridge and Bridgeport Bridge in Kitchener, and the Caledonia Bridge (now renamed) in Caledonia.

On August 19, 1982, it was designated as a historic place under Part IV of the Ontario Heritage Act (By-law 2225) and given Municipal ID (IDM) number 10817. It is also listed on the Ontario Heritage Bridge list.

In 2009, the bridge underwent repairs and reconstruction. It re-opened to the public in July, 2009.

References

External links

Transport buildings and structures in Cambridge, Ontario
Bridges in the Regional Municipality of Waterloo
Road bridges in Ontario
Road transport in Cambridge, Ontario
Tied arch bridges in Canada
Grand River (Ontario)